Danny Menting (born 5 May 1990 in Groningen) is a Dutch footballer who currently plays as a midfielder for ACV in the Dutch Topklasse. He formerly played for FC Groningen, SC Veendam and FC Emmen.

External links
 Voetbal International

1990 births
Living people
Dutch footballers
FC Groningen players
SC Veendam players
FC Emmen players
Eredivisie players
Eerste Divisie players
Footballers from Groningen (city)
Association football midfielders
Asser Christelijke Voetbalvereniging players